The 2020 Auto Club 400 was a NASCAR Cup Series race held on March 1, 2020, at Auto Club Speedway in Fontana, California. Contested over 200 laps on the  D-shaped oval, it was the third race of the 2020 NASCAR Cup Series season.

Report

Background

It is also used for open wheel racing events. The racetrack is located near the former locations of Ontario Motor Speedway and Riverside International Raceway. The track is owned and operated by International Speedway Corporation and is the only track owned by ISC to have naming rights sold. The speedway is served by the nearby Interstate 10 and Interstate 15 freeways as well as a Metrolink station located behind the backstretch.

Entry list
 (R) denotes rookie driver.
 (i) denotes driver who are ineligible for series driver points.

Practice

First practice

Final practice

Qualifying

Qualifying results

Race

Stage Results

Stage One
Laps: 60

Stage Two
Laps: 60

Final Stage Results

Stage Three
Laps: 80

Race statistics
 Lead changes: 16 among 8 different drivers
 Cautions/Laps: 3 for 13
 Red flags: 0
 Time of race: 2 hours, 37 minutes and 7 seconds
 Average speed:

Media

Television
The race was the 20th race Fox Sports covered at the Auto Club Speedway. Mike Joy and three-time Auto Club winner Jeff Gordon called the race in the booth for Fox. Jamie Little, Regan Smith, Vince Welch and Matt Yocum handled the pit road duties for the television side. Larry McReynolds and Jamie McMurray provided insight from the Fox Sports studio in Charlotte.

Radio
MRN had the radio call for the race, which was also simulcast on Sirius XM NASCAR Radio. Alex Hayden, Jeff Striegle and 2001 race winner Rusty Wallace called the race from the booth when the field raced their way down the front stretch. Dan Hubbard called the race from a billboard outside turn 2 when the field raced their way through turns 1 and 2 & Kyle Rickey called the race from a billboard outside turn 3 when the field raced their way through turns 3 and 4. Kim Coon, Steve Post and Dillon Welch had the pit road duties for MRN.

Standings after the race

Drivers' Championship standings

Manufacturers' Championship standings

Note: Only the first 16 positions are included for the driver standings.

References

Auto Club 400
Auto Club 400
Auto Club 400
NASCAR races at Auto Club Speedway